Amanda Brown may refer to:
Amanda Brown (novelist) (born 1977), American author of the novel Legally Blonde (basis for the film)
Amanda Brown (musician) (born 1965), Australian musician and former member of The Go-Betweens
Amanda Brown (tennis) (born 1965), British former tennis player
Amanda Brown (voice actress), American voice actress of many 4Kids voice roles, including Zoey Hanson in Mew Mew Power
Amanda Brown (singer) (born 1985), American contestant on the third season of The Voice
Amanda M. Brown, American immunologist and microbiologist